Semo Kamea (born 21 August 2001) is a Papua New Guinean cricketer. In March 2022, he was named in Papua New Guinea's One Day International (ODI) squads for both the 2022 United Arab Emirates Tri-Nation Series and 2022 Papua New Guinea Tri-Nation Series, and their ODI and Twenty20 International (T20I) squad for the tour of Nepal.

He made his ODI debut on 25 March 2022, for Papua New Guinea against Nepal. He made his T20I debut on 1 April 2022, for Papua New Guinea against Malaysia.

References

External links
 

2001 births
Living people
Papua New Guinean cricketers
Papua New Guinea One Day International cricketers
Papua New Guinea Twenty20 International cricketers
Place of birth missing (living people)